Romeo is the second studio album by Irish-Scottish music producer and musician Sega Bodega. It was released via his Nuxxe label on 12 November 2021. It features French actor and singer Charlotte Gainsbourg, and Venezuelan music producer and artist Arca.

It was preceded by the single releases of "Only Seeing God When I Come", "Angel on My Shoulder", and "I Need Nothing from You".

The album details a conceptual, fictionalised relationship between Sega Bodega and "a girlfriend made entirely of light, named Luci". He has described the album as "the record I always wanted to make". The album also explores themes of close connection to others, with the single "Angel on My Shoulder" being about the idea of never meeting a close friend, and "Um Um" being inspired by the memory of the late producer Sophie, whom Sega Bodega was close to.

The album art, and its respective singles and promotional art, were shot by Aidan Zamiri.

Track listing
All tracks are produced by Sega Bodega, except "All My Friends Think I'm Too Young For You", produced by Sega Bodega and Taylor Skye.

Personnel
 Sega Bodega – vocals, production
 Taylor Skye – production (track 3)
 Conall – additional vocals (track 5)
 Kwaye – additional vocals (track 5)
 BEA1991 – additional vocals (track 5)
 Charlotte Gainsbourg – featured vocals (track 6)
 Arca – featured vocals (track 7)
 Isamaya Ffrench – additional vocals (track 9)
 James Rand – mixing, mastering
 Katie Tavini – mixing, mastering

Notes

References

2021 albums
Electronic dance music albums by Irish artists
Electronic dance music albums by Scottish artists
UK bass albums